The Woodside Elementary School District is a single school K-8 public school district in the San Francisco Bay Area, serving incorporated Woodside. Students from this school district who continue on with public schooling matriculate to the Sequoia Union High School District.

It has Woodside Preschool, located on the elementary school campus; Woodside Elementary School (TK-5), which has about 300 students; and Woodside Middle School.

References

External links
 

School districts in San Mateo County, California